Rory Records is an independent record label founded in 2012 by Max Bemis (of Say Anything) as an imprint of Equal Vision Records. Rory Records releases are distributed through Equal Vision's distributor RED Distribution.

Roster
 Matt Pryor
 Merriment
 Museum Mouth
 Perma
 Pretty and Nice
 Rising Fawn
 Saves the Day
 Two Tongues

Former
 TALLHART (Disbanded 2014)
 XO

See also
 Equal Vision Records
 List of record labels

References

American independent record labels